The Lewis & Clark Baseball League, or LCBL, was a collegiate summer baseball league comprising teams of the top college players from the St. Louis metropolitan area and beyond. Founded by Nicholas R. A. Mahrt in 2013, this upstart amateur baseball season runs from June through early August in the St. Louis metropolitan area. It is a non-profit organization and the charter member of the Commonwealth Leagues United  a nationwide collection of baseball leagues that put the emphasis on student-athlete's summer work/study opportunities. Players are not paid, as to maintain their college eligibility and amateur status; their ages range from 18 to 23.

About the League

Players choose to exclusively compete during the week or on the weekends; breaking the teams into two even conferences, the Lewis and the Clark. Teams are scheduled to play 36 games over an eight-week season, culminating in an early-August playoff. The playoffs consist of a best-of-three Discovery Cup Series, matching the two division winners in the Lewis Conference and the two in the Clark Conference. After the best of the weekend and weekday are crowned, these conference champions meet in a one-game, winner-take-all title game. The current league champions, the winners of the 2014 Corps of Discovery Cup, are the Voyagers.

Miller Orthopedics serves as the platinum sponsor for the Lewis & Clark Baseball League. As a former pupil of world-renowned surgeon Dr. James Andrews, Dr. Mark Miller provides sports medicine support to the finest athletes in the region. Should the need arise, LCBL players will experience the same level of medical expertise as members of the St. Louis Rams and St. Louis Cardinals.

There are opportunities for individuals to seek sponsors, internal positions with the LCBL (field and gameday operations), and part-time employment/internships with local companies. Those that play exclusively on the weekend (Lewis Conference) can even maintain a 40-hour/week schedule and still play all their team's games.

Player registration annually opens in November of the previous year; it triggers the official recruitment period, where student-athletes can commit to playing with a particular LCBL team. The league has grown from four teams to eight and will reach its peak expansion of 14 teams in 2016.

It was announced in early 2017 that the league folded.

Origin 

In the summer of 2012, Nicholas Mahrt  then-assistant coach for Washington University in St. Louis  coached in the St. Louis Metro League. His participation with that particular collegiate baseball organization left him dissatisfied with the local product that was being offered. Mahrt noticed the Metro League model lacked an opportunity for college players to pursue both aspects of their college experience.  Due to a schedule that was loaded with games on weekdays and weekends, student-athletes were ultimately forced to choose between baseball and a summer job/internship. By playing in most summer leagues, young adults forgo a chance to enhance their post-collegiate careers. Declining an invitation, in order to gain career knowledge and collect a summer paycheck, means college players forgo sharpening their baseball skills.

With that mindset, Mahrt set out to create a new product, to address a need for balance between sports league and continuing education:

For Mahrt, the level of talent that the Metro League attracts only widened the work/play disconnect. For nearly all league players, the finality of their senior year was also the end of their competitive playing days.  Since a negligible percentage of student-athletes make a future living off playing baseball, most need their last collegiate summer months to build a resume. Mahrt never advocated that 20-year-olds "give up" baseball in lieu of work experience. In fact, he firmly stated that the summer should be used as an instructional period for all to reach their sports pinnacle.  His new league simply sought a way to provide better balance to each player's offseason schedule.

The result was a brainstorming session about the creation of a new league. Mahrt and fellow Wash. U. assistant coach, W. Ross Clites, threw out ideas of a league that operates as two separate entities.  One "conference" would play its games strictly on Friday evenings, Saturdays and Sundays. This would present players with an opportunity to commute to St. Louis, if need be, while maintaining the prototypical Monday through Friday (40-hour/week) job. Players could even take summer college courses wherever they call home.

Clites, who also worked as a golf operations manager at a local course  with peak business demand on the weekends  suggested there were ample local companies that also require full-time Friday through Sunday staffing.  Creating a "conference" that operates solely on weekdays still gives players a chance to take part-time seasonal jobs, with weekend-based hours. This "conference" also doubles as the place for student-athletes to play if they have no desire to work or intern in the summer. Though not encouraged, if they simply come to the league to become a better baseball player, the weekday is for them.

Simply freeing the schedule for players to pursue employment was not enough. Mahrt did not want potential recruits to have to "go it alone." With a wide range of local business contacts in tow, the league actively pairs players with suitable employers. League officers spend as much time and energy placing student-athletes with companies  matching each individual's area of study  as they do placing them on teams. The LCBL's competitive advantage over other leagues is its network of companies; the Find Your Way Program. In its first year of existence, over 20 companies from the local St. Louis area had players from the LCBL either interning, job shadowing, fast-tracked for interviews, or otherwise employed.  The league also employs several sports management, marketing, broadcasting, and journalism majors as player-interns for gameday operations.

Branding 

The two-silhouette logo is inspired by, of all things, a highway sign. Mahrt was driving to a Metro League game in 2012  thinking out loud about his new league  when he took special notice of the imagery used to demarcate the Lewis and Clark National Historic Trail. It is something he had seen countless times, as the signs appear every five miles along the Missouri River. But seen while dreaming about a future business venture, the sign took on a new life. The trail's triangular logo evolved into the circular centerpiece in the Lewis & Clark Baseball League primary wordmark.

Mahrt desired a name that paid homage to the rich history that surrounds St. Louis.  But with a lofty ambition to draw talent from coast-to-coast, the moniker also needed to carry national recognition. Too locally-responsive and it would not be approachable or understood by college players back east or out west. The trek of Meriwether Lewis and William Clark perfectly encapsulated that aspired versatility.

Even in the 21st century, Lewis and Clark are still a point of pride and reverence in all of America, despite a current culture that is apathetic to its own history.  Their iconic presence is still felt in elementary school curriculum, as well as products, businesses, and schools that carry their namesake.  Any town that developed along their early-1800s route has a distinct Lewis and Clark identity or influence.

Though the Lewis and Clark Expedition covered thousands of miles, it had just one symbolic starting point: eastern Missouri. For Mahrt, that was enough to tether the region to the league. It could be something St. Louisans embrace as their own; the local summer collegiate baseball league, without overtly using the city name or the typical Gateway Arch graphic.  Since the area was the launch site for one historic journey, so too could it be the beginning of brilliant careers (baseball or otherwise) for other young men.

The ampersand that commonly links Lewis to Clark has become the iconic shorthand logo, with an epsilon version prominently displayed on the front of every team's hat. The league chose to showcase one unifying logo  in this case, a punctuation mark  instead of unique, team-specific fonts or graphics. The colors differentiate one team from all others. It can be an ambiguous conversation starter, but there is no denying that each team's New Era caps are clearly part of the same league. For this reason, the "Amp[ersand] League" is another colloquial nickname for the LCBL.

Philosophy 

The LCBL is a unique summer collegiate league for many reasons; most notably, the option players have to swing a bat made of wood or metal. Since Major League Baseball and Minor League Baseball solely use wood bats, nearly all other top-tier summer leagues exclusively use wood.
Even with new BBCOR standards to reduce batted ball exit speed, using the technology of composite bats is perceived to inflate offensive power and thus misrepresent statistics to pro scouts.  Thus, Major League Baseball only sponsors, and partially funds, wood-bat leagues. They do so as a common denominator metric to judge, compare, and project the value of both hitters and pitchers to the professional game.

Due to subtle differences in length-to-weight ratios, and the discernible feeling at contact, the potential exists for a difficult transition period from metal (college) to wood (pro). To avoid this steep learning curve, more and more collegiate athletes use the summer as acclimation time with the tools of their future trade. The unapologetic objective of premier leagues is to prepare their amateur players for the Major League First-Year Player Draft, using the summer as a professional proving ground. MLB seizes the logistical opportunity to get talent, professional-caliber equipment, and franchise representatives all in one place. The LCBL believes that such models compromise the spirit of the league's competitive nature; each game is too much like an audition or stepping stone.  Professional baseball is not on the horizon for every college player, in need of a summer league.

This is not to say that the LCBL has no desire to get players drafted. The commissioner's office simply understands its rarity. Making everyone swing wood, just to accommodate the 9.7% that will play baseball at the next level, is painting with a broad stroke. For a player who rationally understands that he has hit his ceiling  that upon the completion of his senior year he will never play competitive baseball again  it makes all the sense in the world for him to swing a bat with collegiate specifications.  Forcing such a player to limit their power, and spend a summer using tools they will not operate back on campus, is misguided. It can lead to a bigger re-adjustment period than not playing any offseason baseball at all.

The Lewis & Clark Baseball League is as elite as any rival wooden bat league, with a bigger onus on team success and without the MLB sponsorship. LCBL players stay in the moment and enjoy the summer for what it is: a competitive league with a coveted championship trophy, where players can swing what they do in college.

The "Find Your Way" motto encourages each individual to shape the league to fit their unique situation. Some players stubbornly see it as the ground floor for an unheralded pro career, and swing wood. Others tinker their swings, with the familiarity of metal, in an attempt to be the best collegiate player possible. There is no shame, or stigma, in either bat selection. Furthermore, success with composite materials stand as good of a chance to get professional attention.  Those are the core beliefs of the Lewis & Clark Baseball League's Barrel Up Initiative, encouraging players to swing what is comfortable.

The league is not blind to the fact that young adults get excited to be seen by pro scouts. For this reason, the LCBL is in the preliminary talks with members of the St. Louis Cardinals front office, in hopes they might expand their presence in 2014.
All these factors hark back to the decision to name the league after Meriwether Lewis and William Clark. Their historical journey through the unknown epitomized the primary objective of the LCBL. For a college kid, post-baseball life is the great unknown.  The league is tailored to the NCAA tagline: "There are over 380,000 student-athletes, and most of us go pro in something other than sports."  With ample internship opportunities  to use their time in St. Louis as a networking, personal marketing, and resume-building experience  players leave the summer having found their way in more than just baseball wins and losses.

Teams 

Currently, there are ten teams in the Lewis & Clark Baseball League; up from four in the inaugural season. A second expansion is set for 2015, bringing the final count to twelve. Teams are broken into two conferences  Clark (weekdays) and Lewis (weekends)  and evenly dispersed into four divisions. The divisions are named for the four major waterways in the St. Louis area: Mississippi River, Missouri River, Meramec River, and River Des Peres.

The names within the LCBL encompass the vast job descriptions of Meriwether Lewis and William Clark. Beyond exploring new lands, the two American heroes were both territorial governors, soldiers, and unrivaled natural historians.  Their various titles are commemorated, as team nicknames, across the chest of each player's jersey.

One of the teams, in particular, subtly honors the accomplishments of the less-heralded William Clark. The Lieutenant's role in the expedition had always taken a historical backseat to that of Captain Meriwether Lewis. However, in 2001, president Bill Clinton promoted Clark to the military rank of Captain of the Regular Army; posthumously placing Clark on equal standing as Lewis.  Recognizing this important gesture, the LCBL has a team called the Captains, fittingly in the Clark Conference.

In the first two seasons, none of the teams carried a specific location identifier, since all are the product of the St. Louis metropolitan area. Contrary to the industry standard, the LCBL preferred to have the teams be known by the nickname exclusively. In 2015, this changed in the Lewis Conference, as franchise ownership shifted from league-controlled to individual general management groups. For example, the Pioneers are now branded as the Alton Pioneers; referencing the town in Illinois where the team calls home.

Lewis Conference 

Despite the goal of having both conferences up and running in 2013, the weekend league was the only one to take off in the inaugural season of the LCBL.  Four teams played 28 games, exclusively on the weekends, in year number one. In a tongue-in-cheek tribute to Major League Baseball's National League, the Lewis Conference carries the nickname "Senior Circuit" for its longer existence; albeit only one year over the Clark Conference.

In 2014, the "Founding Four"  original Lewis & Clark Baseball League franchises  realigned and set out to fill six teams.  The Pioneers and Explorers returned to the Lewis Conference, where they were always meant to play. With the stalled launch of weekday play, the two spent the 2013 in the Clark Conference to maintain the Lewis & Clark motif.

However, the Lewis Conference was only able to secure one of their two expansion teams, for 2014. The Governors played in the Lewis, but the Voyagers were needed in the Clark to restore competitive balance. The two met in the 2014 Corps of Discovery Cup Championship. According to preseason plans, these teams would have never matched up in an inter-conference title game. The Voyagers followed the same script as the Explorers the year before: play in the Clark Conference (on a one-year conditional basis), win the league championship, then switch conferences the very next season. One month after winning the Cup, the Voyagers officially became the sixth member of the Lewis Conference.

With two more expansion teams in 2015, the Lewis Conference is now up to its final size: eight franchises. They are broken into (2) four-team divisions, the Des Peres and the Meramec  two lesser-known rivers in the area that feed into the Mississippi-Missouri Watershed.

Teams in the Lewis Conference continue to play games exclusively on Friday evenings, Saturdays, and Sundays. During the course of an eight-week summer schedule, each team plays every other Lewis Conference team on multiple occasions. Those in the same division square off in (3) two-game series scattered throughout the season. In some instances, four of the games versus a common opponent could occur in the same weekend. Regardless, it amounts to six games, split evenly home and away, against the three divisional foes.

The schedule is then filled with games against the four teams in the other division. Lewis Conference teams never play regular-season games against Clark Conference opponents. Instead, they crossover to play four games each with all the inter-divisional opponents. The 18 divisional games, along with the 16 cross-division match-ups, give each team a total of 34 regular-season games.

Clark Conference 

Teams in the Clark Conference are the relative newcomers to the LCBL, not starting play  exclusively on weekdays  until 2014. The conference did exist in 2013, but in name only. The label was simply used to differentiate between the original four teams; splitting the league in half solely for All-Star and playoff purposes. The Pioneers and Explorers played one conditional season in the Clark, with the Explorers incongruously capturing the Discovery Cup Championship for the conference (before it even launched). The official unveiling of the Clark Conference came a month later.

The first season of play was slated to introduce the Lookouts, Navigators, Captains, and Diplomats. When the Navigators announced they would need another year to become operational, the Voyagers  a 2014 expansion team meant for the Lewis Conference  moved over to fill the void. In 2015, one final realignment has returned all the teams to their originally-intended location. The Voyagers go back to the Lewis Conference; taking with them yet another league title. Strangely, the first two LCBL Champions now reside in the Lewis, but won the Cup while members of the Clark.

With some temporary modifications, the franchise model that Mahrt and Clites envisioned had been adhered to enough to proceed. The plan for each conference was for four teams in year one, six in year two, and eight by year three. By that third-year checkpoint, the goal was to transfer majority ownership of each team to groups/individuals. With a "head start" the Lewis Conference reached its eight in the first three seasons. Even though only three Clark franchises had players on the field in 2014, the LCBL business model pushed forward as if all four did. The four were joined by two new teams, in accordance to the expansion timeline. They are broken into (2) three-team divisions, the Mississippi and the Missouri — the two area rivers with a national reach.

Players 

The talent level of the players who participate in the LCBL has always been tailored to the student-athlete. The largest representation among the various levels of collegiate baseball is that of the Division-III athlete. This is both the byproduct of an ample baseball programs in the St. Louis area (evidenced by an entire conference bearing "St. Louis" in its moniker) and also part of the original mission of the commissioner. As D-III coaches, Mahrt and Clites looked to take care of their own under-served market sector first.

The LCBL has a wider eligibility range than typical summer baseball programs. Rosters from the Prospect League, for instance, are composed exclusively of freshmen, sophomore, and junior class players from four-year affiliated institutions. Additionally, no more than four members of the same institution are permitted to play on the same summer team. The mindset is to give opportunities to those with proven collegiate ability and at least one year remaining in their college baseball careers.

The Lewis & Clark Baseball League certainly aims to follow this model, but the league is not MLB funded or NCAA sanctioned, so it can grant generous exemptions. If a high school senior has a letter of acceptance into an accredited college or university, and it is accompanied by a letter from the school's baseball coach  confirming a mutual commitment, offered athletic scholarship(s), or general recruiting interest  the individual is permitted to play in the LCBL during the summer before his first collegiate semester.

Furthermore, the league also uniquely grants eligibility on the back-end of a college player's career. Academic seniors and graduate students are permitted to play one final summer of baseball, so long as their graduation day, most recent college baseball season, and final LCBL season all correspond in the same calendar year.  This means that a player does not have to return to a college or university upon August's completion of the league schedule.

Recruiting 
To ensure playing time, each team in the LCBL has a roster maximum of 23 players. These spots are specifically broken down position-by-position, with very little flexibility or deviation. Mahrt did not want a scenario where a college catcher joined a team that already had two.  Players come to the LCBL to hone their skills at their primary positions, not platoon 33% of the time or get thrown into an unknown place on the field. Thus, each manager in the league is restricted in recruiting two catchers, three middle infielders, three corner infielders, five outfielders, seven (primary) pitchers, and one designated hitter. There is one bonus recruit: a utility piece with flexibility of playing in any of the previous position groups, even if it exceeds the limitations (e.g. a fourth middle infielder).

All LCBL managers are encouraged to personally recruit as many players as possible, based on positional needs of the team. Since most managers are also college assistant coaches, the recruiting process typically starts by filling the summer roster with student-athletes from their own conference or schools with prior affiliations. The only restriction: an NCAA coach cannot manage his own college player during the summer.
To provide continuity, managers must (at the very least) offer any eligible players a chance to return to their previous teams. If the returning player commits, it counts as a recruit towards the manager's total. Players sign letters of commitment upon registration, stating that the manager made an offer and the player will forgo the draft process by accepting.
Should a player decline — either because he does not want to play for that same manager again, or he simply desires to play on a different team  he holds the power to opt out, pending league approval. Returning players that decline an offer from their original team become restricted free agents and, if no other manager "recruits" them to switch teams, they go into the pool of draftable candidates.  The one stipulation is that they cannot be drafted by the team they left.

Gateway Players 

Clites came up with a narrow-focus marketing plan that specifically targets out-of-state college baseball players with St. Louis ties. Rather than cast a wide net into the national talent pool, he compiled a database of nearly 40 recent graduates  from local high schools  that traveled extensive distances to play college baseball. The approach is to grant referral discounts to these players (in schools over 150 miles away) who house college friends that commit to play in the league.

Clites recognized that these journeying players need an incentive to come back to St. Louis for their summer months. Their parents likely prefer it, and the availability of a familiar job increases, but that is not enough. The convincing requirement for the student-athlete is whether their summer baseball experience will be top-notch. If Mahrt and Clites could make the domestic product equal or better than anywhere else, people would willingly come back home.

To achieve this standard of excellence, the LCBL put the quality of the league in the player's hands; enticing superior St. Louis-based talent to be their own promoters. If they come back home to play, and bring a skilled college teammate, it becomes a win-win for all. Clites coined them "Gateway Players" in a nod to the city's nickname and a play on the tell-a-friend marketing strategy. A vast majority of these players are former members of the St. Louis Gamers (a youth travel program where Clites and Mahrt both coached).  Several are on scholarship at Division-I schools, which only adds to the credibility of the league.

The commissioner's office reviews the application for Gateway Players, verifying that the college teammate does not have prior St. Louis affiliations; no other options to stay in the city. Each applicant must also agree to play in a minimum number of games to qualify. If the request is approved, one registration fee is refunded and the two college teammates operate as a package deal. Both must play on the same team, like brothers in a Little League program. If any manager wants to claim one, they receive the other, but it costs the team two recruiting chips. If the Gateway Players go unsigned in the offseason, they will enter the draft, and must be selected in back-to-back rounds.

The Gateway Player program is yet another example of Lewis and Clark's spirit embodied. The league rewards those that blaze trails to new territory; in this case, the first St. Louis-area high school kids to ever play baseball at several prominent programs across the country. By coming back to the place where their journey started, they are creating two-way paths for others to follow in their footsteps  just like Lewis and Clark. With this program in place, players from states such as California and Texas  that had never before traveled to Missouri  are now playing in the LCBL. Furthermore, they are doing so without having to pay $900 or stay in the house of complete strangers.

Draft 

One logistical issue with a mission to have separate weekday and weekend players is the need for both conferences to have their own tryout and draft process. Players that are not recruited, or are not claimed in free agency, must first select which day of the week they would like to play. For 2014, the Lewis Conference requires a minimum of 138 total players; 92 for the inaugural Clark Conference season. These roster spots come in a random assortment of positions, as each team will have different position limits already reached. Brandon Fairbanks is the league's Director of Recruiting and is responsible for building the pool of un-recruited players.  An open tryout is then held in mid-May.

Even if a player has a limited window of participation  either late to arrive to St. Louis or early to return to his campus  signing a preseason commitment letter counts as recruitment. Each manager's first thirteen recruits operate as non-compensatory additions, meaning teams do not lose out on any draft picks to sign them.  At the point of adding a fourteenth recruit, the coaching staff must weigh the value of that recruit over a pick in the first round in the draft. Sign a fifteenth player, and the decision also costs a team a second-round pick, and so on. If, for example, a team has 18 eligible returnees, and they all sign the mandated offer to come back, then the manager would not draft a player until the sixth round.

This measure ensures league-wide competitive balance and player buy-in with their previous team. The new, un-recruited talent goes to the weaker teams, while the championship-caliber teams  where all the players are eager to return  roll out a nearly identical roster to defend their success. A team could conceivably draft only emergency reserve players. Should they return a majority of the roster and complement the rest with new recruits, the 23 full-time roster spots could be filled well before Opening Day.

After the conference-specific tryouts, the managers begin the draft. Like most major sports leagues, the order is assembled by the previous season's standings in reverse.  Any expansion teams jump to the front of the line, with the first picks of each round. The draft commences until every player is selected, even if teams exceed their 23-player roster cap. The late-round draft picks  those that occupy roster spots 24 and beyond  are notified of their conditional team affiliation. Their registration fee is discounted, while their contact information is kept for emergency roster situations; roster vacancies via injuries, vacations, or those who must return to school in early August. Should they accept this reserve role, each has to sign a league document, stating they understand the possibility exists that they will not play all season.

Roster Submission 

Managers set and submit an active roster (with a maximum of 23 players) each week, operating like a fantasy sports league. Decisions pertaining a player's active status are final until the next week's roster submission. Even if a Clark Conference player is set to miss only one day, should the manager place him on the inactive list, he is not eligible to play any games during that week. If he is kept on the active roster, the team would play with 22 players during his one-game absence (unable to add a willing reserve midweek).

Undrafted "rental" players are eligible to come in and out of the LCBL. Inevitably, a few young adults are late to hear of the LCBL, miss the draft, and/or can only play in a handful of games. With executive committee approval, and only with reserve status, they can still play. In other words, the original 23 players that are recruited or drafted have preferential treatment. If the full-time recruits and draftees are healthy and present, they must be on the active roster. This policy provides competitive balance; no manager can arbitrarily dress a talented "rental" player, who is in town for one week.

This is especially important in the postseason. A few LCBL players are dual-sport athletes and must leave at playoff time for the start of college football practices. In order to qualify for these voided spots, undrafted "rental" players must dress for 15% of their team's total games. Drafted reserves can play in the postseason without this restriction. Since all conference managers had a chance to evaluate (and draft) them before the start of the season, their diminished talents are known. Managers keep these players on-call for a reason; their opportunity to play just might come in the team's most important games.  Both types of reserves must enter the roster while staying within the league's position-by-position limitations, filling a direct need at a particular place on the field.

College Representation 

Students at the following institutions have played for teams in the Lewis & Clark Baseball League:

In addition to this list, Chabot College has sent players to participate in the Lewis & Clark Baseball League, but the two-year school is not a member of any of the associations shown above. In California, junior colleges have their own governing body  the California Community College Athletic Association (CCCAA).

Managers & Coaches 

The "Find Your Way" motto has a host of different interpretations and applications. For Mahrt, the league was as much about the managers and coaches as the players themselves.  The common denominator is the pursuit of future employment; the players can obtain it while participating in the league, the managers can obtain it by participating in the league. The LCBL is a resume-building experience for young talent in the ranks of collegiate assistant coaches.

Mahrt uses resources like the American Baseball Coaches Association to take chances on unknown volunteer assistants, to get them hooked on coaching as a feasible career path. While other leagues have veteran coaches for decades, the league is known for turning over a new crop of talent.  It is not often that a coach in his twenties is given the top responsibilities of a college-level team. For this reason, college assistant coaches come from as far away as Colorado and Florida to be a part of the LCBL coaching ranks.

A few St. Louis-based college assistants offer their employers' field as an LCBL host site. The many facets of familiarity, which come with the decision, give each a distinct advantage over those that travel to St. Louis. Even a former major leaguer, Jason Isringhausen, recognizes the convenience of the league setup. He can spend a few summer months, developing amateur ballplayers, on the same college field where he coaches from August to May.

LCBL field managers are among the youngest in any summer college baseball league. This gives an unrivaled level of comfort to the players, being coached by a man who is closer to their age than their college head coach. However, youth or inexperience is not a viable excuse for not commanding the dugout. The interview process is thorough and each must take their leadership duties very seriously. Upon being hired, managers select their assistant coach and set aside at least one day a week for practice time.

The league's executive committee specifically targets coaches that get results with quiet respect instead of loud degradation. It is a point of extreme emphasis that coaches, who operate by means of intimidation, are not welcome. Believing it has no place in the game, Mahrt decided to use the league as a platform to send a small message on values to all levels of baseball.  Thus, the LCBL managers are typically more approachable and relatable; a perfect fit with the casual, yet serious, atmosphere that comes with summer baseball.

Since LCBL franchises do not have owners or general managers, human resource decisions come from the executive committee, with neutrality and the league's best interest in mind. Mahrt believes the quality of the coach is directly attributable to a team's wins and losses, especially since recruiting is a huge component to the job description.  Thus, teams that continue to struggle will be subjected to league intervention. The manager may be relegated to assistant coach status, while a new field manager is given an opportunity.

Even the perennially successful are asked to move into an administrative role  or take a promotion in a place like the Northwoods League  after a few seasons. With only twelve teams, the league is always looking for places to test the next wave of young talent. The goal of the LCBL is to have just as many famous alumni be coaches as players.

Discovery Series 

The Lewis & Clark Baseball League postseason operates like the major league model of the 1970s; no wild cards, just the four division winners. The difference is that those MLB series were the best-of-five and the LCBL variety can, at most, go three games.

At the culmination of the regular season, division-winning teams stay in St. Louis for one more week. In the Clark Conference, the Meramec champion plays the winner of the Des Peres division. In the Lewis Conference, the top team in the Mississippi standings meets up with the best of the three teams in the Missouri division. These conference finals are known as the Discovery Series  the respective CCDS and LCDS.

They are so named for the group of enlisted men that Meriwether Lewis and William Clark led on their 1804 expedition.  The modern iteration of the Corps of Discovery is the group of 23 baseball players that can collectively "find its way" to a championship. In Mahrt's eyes, "you discover a lot about yourself and your team in the playoffs."

The home team for each Discovery Series is determined by better win percentage, with head-to-head record as the primary tiebreaker. This is part of the reason why teams in the same conference, but opposite divisions, play each other an odd number (seven) of regular-season games. Something as important as postseason home-field advantage does not come down to run differential or a coin flip.

The potential three games are played on back-to-back days. The team with the better record actually begins postseason play as the visiting team, on the road. Game 2 occurs on the next day, with Game 3 (if necessary) to immediately follow. These latter games are played at the home stadium of the conference's top seed.

The team that is twice victorious is crowned the champion of more than just a conference; the Discovery Series winner has an entire portion of the calendar to stand for their greatness  the "Best of Weekday" and the "Best of the Weekend." These two teams then square off in the LCBL's version of the Super Bowl.

Since moving to their rightful spot in the Lewis Conference, the Explorers are the only LCBL team that can ever win a championship in both conferences. Although they played exclusively on the weekends, the Explorers were the "Best of the Weekday" in 2013. They represented the Clark Conference in the first-ever [Corps of] Discovery Cup Championship and won the title. This unique situation is similar to the Milwaukee Brewers of Major League Baseball, switching leagues with a pennant won in its previously-affiliated league.

Corps of Discovery Cup 

To settle the dispute as to which conference is best, a championship game at Busch Stadium crowns league supremacy. It is the second of two games on the Lewis & Clark Baseball League schedule played at the home of the St. Louis Cardinals. The first, the LCBL All-Star Game, allows the best individual players to share the same field as the pros. However, getting there a second time requires a total team effort. Mahrt and Clites decided to reward the conference winners with this championship opportunity, rather than another three- or five-game series at college fields.

The league believes that the players would gladly trade the fairness of a longer championship series for an opportunity to play a winner-take-all title game in a major league ballpark. It gives each player a goal that is both selfish and team-oriented: play in Busch Stadium twice in one year. The one-game finale also grants the league definitive closure. With student-athletes that need to return to campus in August, the conclusion of the season is set before the end of the previous calendar year.

The home team in the Discovery Cup Championship is also determined well before the night of. Giving it to the team with the higher regular-season winning percentage can be skewed by one conference's weaker competitors, and the lack of interleague play prevents head-to-head record deciding. For this reason  despite its unpopularity among baseball fans, including most LCBL executives  the winner of the league's All-Star Game dictates home-field advantage for that year's league championship.

Since, in the words of Clites, "we are all fans of pro ball, and imitation is the highest form of flattery," the LCBL takes as many pages from the Major League Baseball playbook as possible.  Even if the policies are disliked, the league strives for continuity with the nuances of modern baseball. It helps the casual fans; no new quirks to learn, but rather the procedures of a major sports league to fall back on. Therefore, as long as the MLB All-Star Game determines the home team in the World Series, so shall it be for the LCBL.

History of the Trophy 

The iconic Corps of Discovery Cup was graciously donated and re-purposed by The Highlands Golf & Tennis Center, where Clites served as a golf operations manager. The cup and the base are actually separate pieces from two different tennis trophies. Both components have a unique, but revered, past.

The two-foot-tall stem belongs to a participation award given to, of all things, the Davis Cup tennis team from the nation of Ecuador. The clay courts at The Highlands hosted the 1961 Americas Zone semifinal matches of the world-famous Davis Cup, with Ecuador taking on the United States.  Similar to modern soccer matches, the two sides exchanged gifts to express sportsmanship and welcome the visiting team. To commemorate the Latin American team on their final four appearance  in their first-ever Davis Cup tournament  St. Louis native, and star of the U.S. team, Chuck McKinley presented a brass cup to Ecuadorian captain Blas Uscocovich. The ornate top of the two-piece trophy traveled back to Ecuador, but its stand was temporary  used only to keep the cup off the clay surface for photos. It was found in storage of the St. Louis Tennis Hall of Fame at The Highlands.

The crown of the Corps of Discovery Cup comes from a different, even older, clay court contest. From 1910 until 1927, The Highlands St. Louis Amateur Athletic Association (Triple "A")  then known as the St. Louis Amateur Athletic Association (Triple "A")  played host to a regional qualifier for the esteemed U.S. Men's Clay Court Championships.

The Triple "A" tennis club was, and still is, a member of the United States National Lawn Tennis Association.  The governing body has evolved since then: subsequently dropping the "National" and then the "Lawn" from its name. Whatever the acronym, the organization has consistently overseen this national championship (and their qualifying tournaments) for over a century. Now under modern USTA control, the U.S. Clay Court Championship is a prestigious ATP Tour event in Houston, Texas.

Like many governing bodies in sports, American tennis has always been broken into geographical regions. St. Louis currently operates in the USTA Missouri Valley chapter, but it was originally known as the USNLTA Gateway Section. Annually, amateur tennis players would come to The Highlands (St. Louis Triple "A") and play singles matches in a men's open tournament. The winner received a spot in the U.S. Clay Court Championship field, along with a cup with a "G" emblazoned, to represent the Gateway Section.  At the end of each year's celebration, the player would advance to the national site (either Omaha, Chicago, Pittsburgh, Indianapolis, Cincinnati, Cleveland, Detroit, and even elsewhere in St. Louis), but the award was retained by the club for future winners.

The national tournament was not held in 1928 due to financial restructuring and a flu epidemic. When it returned the following year, Triple "A" was no longer a sectional site  and has not been selected since. Until the LCBL refurbished the cup, it had been collecting dust in the Tennis Hall of Fame for 85 years.

The rich history of this patchwork trophy is now deeper, and more of a conversation piece, with the components combined. Thanks to the LCBL, forgotten moments of St. Louis' sports past have been resurrected. It was a two-way street of good fortune for a league that was going to purchase a trophy, with no lineage, in a store. Instead, the league stumbled upon something as storied as the Stanley Cup  with the provenance of a famous portrait.

Postseason Awards 

Deviating slightly from all the other historical tributes to Meriwether Lewis and William Clark, the Lewis & Clark Baseball League hopes to name awards for the league's best pitcher and best offensive player after two St. Louis Cardinals living legends; however, approval for use of those names is pending. Both men are esteemed members of the St. Louis community, and the LCBL hopes to make them honorary board members.

Each individual award is given only to one recipient. There is not a Pitcher of the Year in the Lewis Conference and the Clark Conference, for instance. The best in each conference never get a chance to face each other in the regular season, so they must put up statistics that speak for themselves. The only flaw in this model is the assumption that the talent in both conferences is nearly identical.

Top Pitcher Award 

The award is annually given to the LCBL player with the most distinguished pitching season, regardless of role. This is solely determined by Pitcher Rating, a statistical equation created by Ross Clites in 2010. The formula takes into consideration individual winning percentage, saves (if any), strikeouts, ERA, WHIP, and a pitcher's run support average per start. It takes the subjectivity out of performances that only come around once a week. This is especially essential for pitchers in a summer league, where there's not a sample size of 30+ games and 100+ at-bats to judge. No manager can see all the starts made by each ace, and there is no safety net for an off-day. Thus, No voting and highest PR value wins.

Italics denote league leader''

Offensive MVP Award 

The award is annually given to the LCBL player with the most distinguished offensive season. It is an MVP award that can only be won by a position player; pitchers have their own accolades. Not nearly as complex to explain as the crowning of the Top Pitcher Award, the Top Position Player Award simply requires a traditional voting process. It does, however, mirror the pitching award by rejecting any statistics accumulated during the postseason.

All managers and top assistant coaches receive a ballot, along with the Commissioner's Office). All use game logs from the SportsEngine statistic software to better inform their decisions, especially with those who play in the other conference. The Top Position Player Award winner consistently has offensive numbers in the top ten of the entire league. The voting echoes that of Major League Baseball, with a seemingly arbitrary vector of 14 points for first-place votes, 9 for second, 8 for third, and so on.

Italics denote league leader | † Not enough plate appearances to qualify for league-leading stat''

All-Defensive Team 

Much like professional baseball leagues honor their best glove men, the Lewis & Clark Baseball League annually lists a position-by-position all-defensive team. These nine athletes are voted on strictly by the commissioner's office, after looking over game logs of exceptional defensive plays and overall fielding percentage data. Players in both conferences are in competition for the same list.

New to Major League Baseball in 2011, and adapted for the LCBL, there are certain criterion regarding each position  most notably that each winner only qualifies at his primary spot.  Catchers must be behind the plate in at least half of his team's games. All infielders and outfielders have a 5% boost to this requirement. For a shortstop to qualify, for example, he must play the position (at least one full inning) in 55% of his team's total games. As for pitchers, they need to average an inning pitched for every total team game.

All-Star Game 

The annual Lewis & Clark All-Star Game pits the best players in the Clark Conference against the best in the Lewis. It is played at the midpoint of the season in Busch Stadium, home of the St. Louis Cardinals. The event is also the league's Scout Day — a showcase for invited MLB personnel to evaluate the LCBL's greatest players.

The logo is a take on the MLB All-Star Game logo that the Cardinals used in 2009, when they hosted the 80th Midsummer Classic.

The league schedules the game during the week of July Fourth, giving all players a true week-long All-Star Break for family vacations. The event is obviously dependent on the Cardinals home schedule, but tends to fall on a Thursday night; a time when the odds for an empty Busch Stadium are increased by Major League Baseball's typical travel day. The 2014 All-Star Game will be held on Thursday, July 3 at 7:30 p.m.

General admission to the game is free, and the main concourse concessions are open, but there are several ways for fans to pay a ticket price for an upgraded experience. For the friends and family that want to get as close to the action as possible, the league sells admission to the Cardinals Club. The infamous green seats (typically off-limits during amateur games) provide a front-row viewing experience directly behind home plate. The all-inclusive ticket comes with the full amenities of any pro gameday. It grants access to an internal bar/restaurant, with a wide range of food and beverages that can be delivered to the guest's seats while they watch.

Another option for spectators is the Double Play Benefit.  The event raises money for 100 Neediest Cases  a subsidiary of the St. Louis United Way  and takes place in two stunning locations. Prior to the game, Double Play guests join league executives for a cocktail hour inside the home bullpen. As the pregame festivities wind down, the gala moves up to the Champions Club (luxury suite) for dinner and a chance to meet Cardinals legend Lou Brock. Friends and family enjoy finer dining at tables next to St. Louis' 11 World Series trophies.

Both tickets offer All-Star Game goers unmatched vantage points in Busch Stadium at prices that are significantly discounted from the market value of a professional game. The opportunity to get an autograph from a Hall of Famer is a complimentary bonus. The irony is that Lou Brock was asked to participate in the event long before the connection was made between the Lewis & Clark Baseball League and the St. Louis great's full name: Louis Clark Brock.

The players are hardly shortchanged on their experience; prior to moving up to the Champions Club, Lou Brock stops by both dugouts to meet the Clark Conference and Lewis Conference All-Stars. The on-field action features all the comforts of the major leaguers, too. Public address announcer, John Ulett, is on hand for player and coach introductions before the game. The voice of the Cardinals also calls their name as they walk to the plate or enter the game to pitch.

The scoreboard prominently displays the lineups as if LCBL players were called up the big leagues. Even the Fox Sports Midwest camera crew films the game as intently as a Cubs vs. Cardinals game. The telecast only "airs" inside the ballpark, but is shown  complete with slow-motion replays  on all televisions in the luxury boxes and concourses. St. Louis Cardinals Director of Amateur Games, Chris Breuer makes sure everything, shy of the 46,000 fans, looks and feels like a pro game.

When it comes to player selection for the All-Star Game, the Lewis & Clark Baseball League deviates from its typical following of Major League Baseball procedures. Both the LCBL and MLB use a position-by-position balloting process, but the difference comes in the pitching staff. The reigning pennant-winning major league managers hand-pick their pitchers. The LCBL groups the pitchers with all other players into one pool for voting.

Those who cast the vote are different as well. Major League Baseball gives an unlimited number of ballots to each and every fan. The summer college league hardly has the developed fan base to pull off such a feat. Instead, the managers, league officials, and players come together to add their input.

The LCBL's vote is far more democratic; each elector only votes once. The 23 players on each team select their peers, with some stipulations. They cannot vote for members of the other conference. Put another way, no team is permitted to pick their opposition. This prevents one conference from stuffing the ballot with the weakest players in the other conference.

Also, players cannot select members of their own team. In essence, the players must look to the other teams in their conference and honestly select those that they trust in a pivotal game. Rather than a popularity contest or the staleness of players selecting only their own, LCBL voters must put some thought into the ballot. Receiving a peer vote is the ultimate sign of respect; a non-teammate selection recognizes a rival's talent enough to count on him to win the game.  And that is where the voting format forces competitors to unify for a common purpose: team allegiances take a back seat to that of the conference. Players get tired of hearing that the weekend (or the weekday) is where the best talent in the league plays. The All-Star Game is the pinnacle bragging rights game, allowing players to settle it on the field. The winning conference sends a representative to the home dugout for the Discovery Cup Championship a month later.

LCBL managers submit 12 All-Star candidates (C, 1B, 2B, SS, 3B, OF, OF, OF, DH, SP, SP, RP) to the league by mid-June. All the manager's selections are assembled into team-specific ballots. Players on the Travelers, for example, receive a paper ballot with 60 names: 12 members, arranged by position, from each of the five other Lewis Conference teams. Voters select one player in each positional category (three outfielders, three pitchers). With each team's entire roster, manager, assistant coach, and five members of the LCBL administrative staff all voting, a unanimous All-Star selection would receive 135 votes (5 teams x 23 players + 5 managers + 5 coaches + 5 executives).

The roster is filled to a maximum of 26 players, based on the ballot results. Each conference's top two vote-getters at catcher, first, second, short, third, and designated hitter serve as the respective starters and back-ups. Each roster takes six outfielders, with their rank and alignment up to the discretion of the All-Star manager. The same is true for the eight pitchers (regardless of role) with the highest vote totals. Keeping in line with major league formalities, the managers from the previous season's Discovery Cup Championship call the shots in the All-Star Game. All other league managers serve as bench coaches.

Members of the Travelers and Pathfinders combined to beat the all-stars from the Pioneers and Explorers, in their one-and-only conditional season affiliated with the Clark Conference. The Lewis Conference won the game in an astonishing 1–0 shutout fashion. The feat matched the outcome of the 1968 Major League Baseball All-Star Game in Houston. Ten Lewis Conference pitchers combined to throw nine innings without giving up a run, surrendering just six hits.

Administrative Structure 

Major LCBL decisions pass through the league's Executive Committee. The five-person panel votes on all changes to the LCBL's rules and regulations section of the Player/Coach Code of Conduct handbook. Each member brings their unique expertise: business management, finance, marketing, and law. They have the authority  with a majority vote  to alter, suspend or modify any of the policies of the Lewis & Clark Baseball League. The executive committee is also responsible for the appointing of new field managers, the creation of both conference schedules, the approval of the budget, the purchasing of equipment, and many other administrative tasks.

The actions of the president and all executives are accountable to the board members. These members meet annually to preside over the larger-scale direction of the league. The board is the community barometer; representing businesses and iconic personalities in the city of St. Louis, they present outsiders' perception of the league.

The league also has various senior directors that serve as the trusted advisory staff to the Executive Committee. Each presents a skill set that supplements the general promotion of the league, beyond the local area. Through website design, social media outlets like Facebook and Twitter, or even word-of-mouth marketing in different regions, the advisory staff works hard to spread the brand to all corners of the country.  They are also the key pieces in the fundraising efforts that take place throughout the calendar year. LCBL staff are friends and family of the executives, using their valuable time to volunteer to plan the Double Play Benefit during the All-Star Game. The league even organizes an annual Festivus party to thank everyone in the LCBL family for their dedicated work.

Umpiring Association 

Not just a stepping stone for players and coaches, the LCBL is also a developmental league for umpires. The Lewis & Clark Umpiring Association (LCUA) was founded in 2013, at the culmination of the inaugural campaign. The initial player and coach feedback  regarding the umpires who worked league games in year one  was all positive, so Mahrt decided to lock them in for years to come. To effectively entice the area's best collegiate umpires take part, he created an association to provide them with consistent work and training. Built to rival the Greater St. Louis (GSL) Umpiring Association, the LCUA does for umpires what the LCBL sets out to do for its student-athletes: return a higher quality product to the college ranks in the Fall.

The association empowers each umpire with a stake in the success of the league and the security of administrative support. With "Lewis & Clark" in the name of their association, an incentive is put in place for the umpires to take tremendous pride in their work. The familiar branding presents an opportunity for umpires to advance to the next tier of baseball as the league gains notoriety. In essence, the league belongs as much to the umpires  as much about them "finding their way"  as anyone.

The LCUA operates like a union, with veteran umpire Kyle Johnson serving as the president. is in charge of assigning games and locations to the umpires. If an umpiring vacancy occurs, he oversees the recruiting of a replacement to the crew. As an acting umpire in the league,  is the highest-appointed crew chief  the Director of On-Field Discipline and Umpiring. He has the power to settle rule disputes (in any game, on any field) that require league intervention. He represents all league umpires in meetings where issues like policy changes or contract negotiations need to be taken to the commissioner's office. Before the start of each season,  leads the annual training sessions for all umpires in the league.

The association employs ten full-time umpires, paired up into five two-man crews. These umpires service the league as a whole; there are not separate umpiring crews for each conference. Depending on the flexibility of all ten umpires, the leagues does its best to rotate the game and location assignments. There are also temporary umpires that float in and out in a reserve role. Some of these umpires come from the ranks of Minor League Baseball and college's Big XII Conference, joining the league for a week or two while passing through the St. Louis area.

The league utilizes a four-man crew during the mid-season All-Star Game, as well as four umpires for both the Discovery Series (conference playoffs) and the Discovery Cup Championship.

Corporate Sponsors & Vendors 

A large portion of the LCBL's operating expenses are covered by the registration fees. But with an expressed desire to continually lower the players' fees, the league requires alternative revenue streams to fill the void. One key piece to this economic model is the generous support of local companies. As the LCBL gains sponsors, the players reap the benefits.

Prior to each season, many St. Louis-based companies are asked to take part in Find Your Way Program  the hiring of LCBL players for the summer. Several participants go well beyond providing just an employment opportunity; working with the league to further assist the players they hire. By donating money to the LCBL, the companies indirectly lower the registration fee, and the players keep more of their hard-earned paycheck.

While Rawlings served as the title sponsor in year one, Miller Orthopedics took over the primary sponsorship in 2014  and is its sports medicine caretaker. Additionally,  the LCBL and the St. Louis Cardinals and Busch Stadium staff enjoy a thorough and close professional relationship. Penn Station provides players with sandwiches between double-headers.

For training and recovery, each LCBL team is equipped with Crossover Symmetry bands. The shoulder-strengthening exercises act as preventative medicine for pitchers especially. Teams also have access to All-Star Performance, an indoor facility run by former major leaguers Matt Whiteside and Scott Cooper. There, managers can work on defensive drills, batting practice, bullpen sessions, and weightlifting throughout the season.

The league uses St. Louis-based Spoke Marketing for their advertising plan, while the interactive LCBL website was created by Sports Ngin out of Minneapolis, Minnesota.

League executives have gone as far as creating their own corporate sponsors. Mahrt and Clites have teamed up to launch several baseball business ventures since the formation of the Lewis & Clark Baseball League. Each complementary revenue source serves the league, but also uses its notoriety to cross-market. Town Coopers Baseball is an all-encompassing brand, from apparel to baseball product development. In 2013, Town Coopers expanded onto the field with a youth travel program  15U, 16U, 17U, and 18U teams that will one day funnel their alumni into the Lewis & Clark Baseball League.

Needing a channel to sell Town Coopers and LCBL merchandise, Mahrt looked to create an online marketplace. He launched Gourmet Baseball in August 2013. The boutique site is designed to exclusively carry premium baseball brands like Victory and 22Fresh. Mahrt desired an interface unlike the typical online sporting goods store; one that would operate more like CNET does for the computer industry. He would ask, "when a retail chain shows a parent over 60 youth bats, how are they supposed to pick one?" Countless new offerings inundate the consumer each year, so Gourmet Baseball aims to streamline the buying process with rankings based on user testing. Mahrt's site carries only the top-rated products, showcasing the niche brands, and never offers models from the previous year.

The league itself is a trade name for a parent company and overriding corporate sponsor. Mahrt created the Leagues of Extraordinary Gentlemen in 2012 to stand for a series of summer college baseball leagues in the same portfolio. The Lewis & Clark Baseball League is its first d/b/a.

Record Book 

Pitching

The first year of the LCBL saw several outstanding individual performances, as well as the establishment of impressive single-season high-water marks. The pinnacle achievement was the first  and only  no-hitter in league history, thrown by Brandon Sarkissian on June 29, 2013. The Pathfinders won the game 2–0 over the eventual league-champion Explorers; Sarkissian's final line was 9.0 IP, 0 ER, 0 H, 2 BB, 8 SO.

On July 13, 2013, James Ball of the Pioneers set the league record for strikeouts in a single game. His 12 punch-outs against the Pathfinders came in seven innings of work  a remarkable 57% of the outs recorded coming by way of strikeout. The 2013 Best Pitcher Award winner's 46 strikeouts tied the single-season record, matched by Drue Bravo of the Travelers.

The 2013 Explorers pace the league record book in all the major regular-season team stats: Wins (19), ERA (3.09), and SO (180).

Defense

The longest defensive streak belongs to Connor Einertson of the Travelers. After committing his lone miscue in just the third inning of the entire season, he went on to set the LCBL record for 108 consecutive chances without an error. This is an active streak that will carry over to 2014. Einertson's .991 fielding percentage fell a mere .001 behind Lance Portwood for the single-season record (by a player with a minimum of 60 chances). Portwood contributed to the team record in the same defensive category; the 2013 Pioneers posted a .946 fielding percentage.

Offense

Arguably, the league's best offensive game is property of Jesse Abel of the Explorers. On June 7, 2013, Abel went 3-for-5 with two home runs, a double, and a record six RBIs. He reached base four times and scored three runs in an 11–6 win over the Pathfinders. The home runs were two of Abel's league-leading five HRs. Not to be outdone, Lucas Doerhoff of the Pioneers matched Abel's multi-home-run feat on July 21, 2013. Doerhoff, too, went 3-for-5 on his banner day, but added a triple to go with his pair of home runs. His 11 total bases set an LCBL record for a single game; albeit in a 12–11 loss to the Explorers.

Hits

A day after Jesse Abel produced his six RBI game, he became the first LCBL player to have a five-hit game. This record accomplishment was equaled on June 23, 2013, by two teammates in the same game. Jake Mavropolous and 2013 MVP Collin Henry, both of the Travelers, combined for ten hits (five singles, two doubles, and three triples) in a 13–7 victory. The fourth player to reach the five-hit milestone was yet another Travelers player, Mike Hardin, on July 27, 2013.

 Collin Henry (Travelers) is the single-season record holder with 36 hits, as well as records for batting average (.404) and triples: single-season (5) and single-game (2).
 Brad Ridings (Pioneers) holds the record of 15 doubles in a season. He also led the league with a 19-game hit streak, which is still active heading into the 2014 season. 
 Nick Ulrich (Explorers) is the only player in league history to hit three doubles in one game (7/28/13).

The record for hits by a team in a single game is 21, by the Travelers (6/23/13). That team also holds the record for total hits in a regular season (271) and batting average (.312).

Runs

The record for runs scored by a team in a single game is 19 (Explorers over Pioneers - 6/1/14).

On six occasions a player in the league scored four runs in one game. Two of these instances occurred within a game where the team runs record was achieved. Brett Yasui of the Explorers scored four runs in the first 18-run game and Matt Polites of the Travelers matched the record in latter. Impressively, both players did so as the ninth hitters in their respective lineups.

 Mike Hardin (Travelers) scored four runs in a five-inning span (6/23/13). 
 Brad Ridings (Pioneers) scored four runs, including twice in a record eight-run inning (7/27/13). 
 Aaron Bossi (Explorers) twice scored four runs in a game (7/21/13 and 7/27/13). During the July 21 game, he stole four bases  a record for most in a single game. Bossi's 22 total steals are also the single-season high.

The record for runs scored by a team in a regular season is 266, by the 2013 Explorers.

Winning & Losing Streaks

The Pioneers had the longest winning streak in the regular season  five games. The Explorers ended the 2013 regular season as winners of four straight games, so they enter 2014 on a six-game win streak (counting the two-game sweep in the Discovery Series). The 2013 Pathfinders will go down in history for their futility. They finished the season as losers of 15 consecutive games.

All individual and team records were compiled using GameChanger software.

Future Expansion 

The league is continually on the lookout for college-quality baseball fields for each team to permanently call home. There are plenty of fields that can host a weekend here or there, but very few have enough summer schedule flexibility to accommodate a 37-game season. Most college facilities have summer camps or youth tournaments that would conflict with LCBL games. One potential solution is the creation of a new baseball-only four-field complex in St. Louis, though no plans are currently in the works.

The interest in 12 separate fields stems from the league's desire to eventually turn over control of each ballclub's operations. The LCBL would look like a traditional sports league, with independent franchises that make their own personnel and marketing decisions. The prerequisite to this transition is a facility for each general manager; a stable single-occupant headquarters for the team to develop a "home" fan base and hold consistent practices. Each independent franchise would then be able to charge admission to generate revenue to reinvest.

The league has been instrumental in the re-purposing of Francis R. Slay Park and the refurbishing of Harris-Stowe State University's historic Hornets Field. Both are substandard college fields that hope to be top-tier facilities by 2016. These efforts have been spearheaded by Clites, who holds a Master of Architecture degree, in collaboration with city politicians, school officials, and local planning committees. He is in the developmental stage of incorporating Bat Flip, Inc.  a company he created in college  as a field renovation division of the LCBL.

The immediate growth potential for the league is with its Find Your Way Program. The LCBL is constantly working to build brand awareness within the business community of St. Louis. More internship opportunities for the student-athletes is the number one goal each offseason. This starts with greater internal hiring; compensating more players to update the website, compile stats, maintain the field, etc. The LCBL plans to stream radio broadcasts of their future games, employing sports journalism majors at local colleges.

For the fans, the LCBL created an organization for alumni, friends, and family to stay connected to their favorite LCBL team. The league charges a small, one-time fee for preferred fan status.  Known as the Hadley's Quadrant Club  in reference to the famous navigation tool of Lewis and Clark's expedition  members receive T-shirts, hats, decals, and season tickets for their LCBL loyalty. To gain access at all admission gates, season pass holders will wear (or present) a Stand Up to Cancer wristband.

In time, the league hopes to join the National Alliance of College Summer Baseball. With the NACSB comes all the pomp and financial support of being recognized by Major League Baseball.  The eight members of the esteemed association are recognized as some of the best summer collegiate baseball leagues in the United States. Sanctioning the Lewis & Clark Baseball League would fill a void in the heartland of the country; North Carolina is currently the westernmost state with a team in the NACSB.

The parent company of the LCBL  the Leagues of Extraordinary Gentlemen  has its next stop planned for Denver, Colorado. Mahrt plans to take the success of the St. Louis league back to the place where he attended law school (University of Denver). Branded as the Thin Air Baseball League, play is slated to begin in 2016.

Mahrt and Clites have ambitions of taking their baseball brand to Australia for a winter league, and to Prague, Czech Republic for a college recruiting showcase camp. Both endeavors plan to be operational by 2018.

References

External links 
 http://www.lewisclarkbaseball.com

College baseball leagues in the United States|College baseball in the United States lists